Randal William MacDonnell, 1st Marquess of Antrim (4 November 1749 - 29 July 1791) KB was an Irish peer.

Biography
He was born on 4 November 1749, the only son and heir of Alexander MacDonnell, 5th Earl of Antrim by his second wife Anne, daughter of Charles Patrick Plunkett. 

As Viscount Dunluce he sat in the Irish House of Commons for County Antrim from 1768 to 1775, and served as High Sheriff of Antrim in 1771. At this time Sir John Blaquiere wrote of him as "an idle, unsteady young man, not to be depended upon". He succeeded his father as sixth Earl of Antrim on 13 October 1775 and took his seat in the Irish House of Lords on 13 March 1776. 

On 5 May 1779, he was made a Knight Companion of the Order of the Bath. On 5 February 1783, on the institution of the order, he was nominated a Knight of the Order of St Patrick, but was never installed as he was unwilling to resign the Order of the Bath. He "relinquished the stall intended for him" as a Knight of St Patrick on 8 March 1783. 

Having no male issue, he was, on 19 June 1785, created Viscount Dunluce and Earl of Antrim in the Peerage of Ireland, with a special remainder of those dignities, failing heirs male of his body, to his daughters in order of seniority, and the heirs male of their bodies respectively. He was appointed to the Privy Council of Ireland in 1786, and on 18 August 1789 he was created Marquess of Antrim in the Peerage of Ireland, but without a special remainder.

Antrim married on 3 July 1774 Letitia, widow of the Hon. Arthur Trevor (who died 19 June 1770), and first daughter of Harvey Morres, 1st Viscount Mountmorres by his first wife, Letitia, daughter of Brabazon Ponsonby, 1st Earl of Bessborough. 

He died on 29 July 1791 at Antrim House, Merrion Square, Dublin, and was buried at Bonamargy. On his death the Marquessate of Antrim and such peerage honours as he had inherited (viz. the Earldom of Antrim created in 1620 and the Viscountcy of Dunluce created in 1618) became extinct, but the creations of 1785 devolved as below. His will, dated 14 August 1790, was proved at Dublin on 15 August 1791. 

His widow died of cancer in Grosvenor Square on 7 December 1801, and was buried at St James's Church, Westminster on 14 December. Her will (with nine codicils) was proved on 21 January 1802.

Successors
 Anne Katharine, as first daughter and co-heir, inherited the abovenamed peerages under the special remainder of 1785, becoming suo jure Countess of Antrim and Viscountess Dunluce. She was born on 11 February 1778 along with a twin, Letitia Mary. She married firstly by special licence, on 25 April 1799 at her mother's house in Hanover Square, Sir Henry Vane-Tempest, 2nd Baronet, of Wynyard, County Durham. He died without male issue on 1 August 1813; their only daughter Frances Anne Emily Vane-Tempest inherited his large estates. Lady Antrim married secondly on 27 June 1817, by special licence in Bruton Street, St James's, Edmund Phelps, who took the name of McDonnell by Royal licence on 27 June 1817 and died at Rome on 30 May 1852, aged seventy-two. Lady Antrim died without male issue in Park Lane on 30 June 1834, aged fifty-six, and was buried at St James's Westminster on 7 July. Her will was proved in August 1853 and July 1854.
 Charlotte, her only surviving sister and heir, inherited the peerages under the special remainder of 1785, succeeding as suo jure Countess of Antrim and Viscountess Dunluce. She was born on 12 August 1779, and as "Lady Charlotte McDonnell" married on 18 July 1799 Vice-Admiral Lord Mark Robert Kerr, third son of William John Kerr, 5th Marquess of Lothian, at her mother's house in Hanover Square. She died at Holmwood at Shiplake Row, near Henley, on 26 October 1835, and was buried at Shiplake on 4 November. Her husband, who was born on 12 November 1776, died on 9 September 1840. Their sixth but first surviving son, Hugh Seymour Kerr, succeeded to the Earldom and assumed the surname of McDonnell by royal licence of 27 June 1836.

References

External links
 p. 176-8.

1749 births
1791 deaths
Irish MPs 1769–1776
High Sheriffs of Antrim
Knights Companion of the Order of the Bath
Members of the Privy Council of Ireland
Marquesses of Antrim
Members of the Parliament of Ireland (pre-1801) for County Antrim constituencies
People from Shiplake